Dias Keneshev (born 31 March 1985 in Urzhar) is a biathlete from Kazakhstan. He competed for Kazakhstan at the 2010 Winter Olympics. Keneshev was Kazakhstan's flag bearer during the 2010 Winter Olympics opening ceremony.

References 

1985 births
Living people
People from Urzhar District
Biathletes at the 2010 Winter Olympics
Biathletes at the 2014 Winter Olympics
Olympic biathletes of Kazakhstan
Kazakhstani male biathletes
Asian Games medalists in biathlon
Biathletes at the 2011 Asian Winter Games
Asian Games gold medalists for Kazakhstan
Medalists at the 2011 Asian Winter Games